The 2017 season was Yorkshire Diamonds' second season, in which they competed in the Women's Cricket Super League, a Twenty20 competition. The side finished fifth in the group stage, winning two of their five matches.

The side was captained by Lauren Winfield and coached by the newly appointed Paul Grayson. They played one home match at Headingley Cricket Ground, and one at Clifton Park, York.

Squad
Yorkshire Diamonds announced their 15-player squad on 26 July 2017. Age given is at the start of Yorkshire Diamonds' first match of the season (11 August 2017).

Women's Cricket Super League

Season standings

 Advanced to the Final.
 Advanced to the Semi-final.

League stage

Statistics

Batting

Bowling

Fielding

Wicket-keeping

References

Yorkshire Diamonds seasons
2017 in English women's cricket